Daniëlle van de Donk (born 5 August 1991) is a Dutch professional footballer who plays as a midfielder for French Division 1 Féminine club Olympique Lyonnais and the Netherlands national team. She helped her national team to win the UEFA Women's Euro 2017 and finish second at the 2019 FIFA Women's World Cup.

Early life
Born in Valkenswaard, Netherlands, Van de Donk grew up playing football with boys. Her uncle noted, "If she started training at FC Eindhoven, she was laughed at by the boys. When she had played 3 balls, they were all silent."

Club career

2008–2011: Willem II
At age 17, Van de Donk first played as a professional football for Dutch Eredivisie club, Willem II. She featured for the Tricolores for the next four seasons, playing in 47 competitive league matches and scoring five goals. During her first season in 2008, she played eighteen of the 24 matches and scored one goal. In her second season, she suffered an anterior cruciate ligament (ACL) injury, which kept her off the field for several months. She made seven appearances for Willem II during the 2009–10 season and the club finished in third place with a  record. During the 2010–11 season, she scored four goals in 21 matches playing as a starting midfielder.

2011–12: VVV-Venlo
Van de Donk signed with VVV-Venlo ahead of the 2011–12 season. She played 18 regular season games, scoring 8 goals as a starter for the club. During a match against Heerenveen, Van de Donk scored a brace lifting her team to a 2–1 win. During a match against PEC Zwolle, she scored the game-winning goal in the 83rd minute to lift VVV to a 5–4 win. During another match against Heerenveen, Van de Donk scored a second brace helping VVV win 3–1. VVV finished in fifth place with a  record. She also helped VVV reach the final of the KNVB Women's Cup in 2012.

2012–2015: PSV/FC Eindhoven
Van de Donk then left Venlo for PSV/FC Eindhoven ahead of Eindhoven's participation in the inaugural season of the Dutch & Belgian BeNe League. With Eindhoven, Van de Donk reached the final of the KNVB Cup of 2014, where she eventually earned a runners-up medal. She racked up an outstanding 30 goals in 53 appearances for the club.

2015: Göteborg
In June 2015, Van de Donk was transferred to Swedish Damallsvenskan club Kopparbergs/Göteborg FC. Van de Donk made 13 appearances for the club, scoring 4 goals. During a match on 11 October, Van de Donk scored a brace —the team's only goals — in a 4–2 loss to KIF Örebro. Göteborg finished the 2016 season in sixth place with a  record.

2015–2021: Arsenal

On 20 November 2015, Van de Donk signed with English club Arsenal of the FA Women's Super League (FA WSL). The move proved successful with her starting in the 2016 FA Cup final on 14 May 2016. Arsenal were eventually crowned champions, beating Chelsea 1–0 at the Wembley Stadium to earn their fourteenth FA Cup title.

On 7 October 2016, Van de Donk signed a new contract with Arsenal and was a starting midfielder in 14 of the 15 games she played. Van de Donk scored three goals helping lift Arsenal to a third place finish with a  record. During the FA WSL Spring Series, she scored two goals in eight matches.

During the 2017–18 season, Van de Donk scored five goals in 18 matches. She scored a brace in the match against Bristol City on 20 May lifting Arsenal to a 6–1 win with the first and last goals of the match. Arsenal finished in third place with a  record.

Van de Donk was instrumental in Arsenal's 2018–19 WSL championship season. She scored 23 combined goals and assists in all competitions. Sports Illustrated described her as "crucial to Arsenal's efforts in trying to recapture a first Women's Super League title since 2012." On 17 November, her double nutmeg went viral on Twitter. Arsenal finished in third place with a  record.

Marking her fifth year with the club, Van de Donk signed a new long-term contract with Arsenal in March 2019. Of the signing, Arsenal manager Joe Montemurro said, "She brings a world class attitude and quality that are vital to our team." During the 2019–20 season, she scored five goals in 15 matches. The FA suspended the season because of the COVID-19 pandemic, deciding the competition based on points per game. Arsenal finished in third place with a  record and played in the 2019–20 FA WSL Cup, where they eventually lost 2–1 to Chelsea during the 2020 FA Women's League Cup Final.

In October 2020, she was named WSL Player of the Week after her performance in a 5–0 win against Brighton & Hove Albion. Van de Donk scored Arsenal's second goal and had over 60 touches on the ball.

2021–present: Olympique Lyonnais
In June 2021, Olympique Lyonnais announced they had signed Van de Donk to a two-year contract. On 5 September 2021, she made her league debut for Lyon against Saint-Étienne.

International career

At the age of 19, Van de Donk made her debut for the Netherlands national team in a match against Mexico on 15 December 2010 at the 2010 City of São Paulo Tournament. She scored her first official international goal in the 2013 European Championship qualifiers against Serbia.

In June 2013, Dutch national team coach Roger Reijners selected Van de Donk for the Netherlands squad for UEFA Women's Euro 2013 in Sweden. The Netherlands squad lost all three of their group stage matches and did not advance at the tournament.

Van de Donk competed at the 2015 FIFA Women's World Cup in Canada under the direction of Reijners. After finishing third in Group A and placing second in the ranking of third place teams, the Netherlands advanced to the knockout round where they faced 2011 champions, Japan and lost 2–1.

On 14 June 2017, Van de Donk was selected as part of the Dutch squad for UEFA Women's Euro 2017 on home soil. She went on to play an integral part in the tournament. In the semi-finals, she scored against England in a 3–0 win for the Dutch. Van de Donk also played in the final against Denmark, where her creative presence helped the Netherlands come away with a victory. After the tournament, the team was honoured by the Prime Minister Mark Rutte and Minister of Sport Edith Schippers and made Knights of the Order of Orange-Nassau.

Van de Donk was selected to the final squad for the 2019 FIFA Women's World Cup in France. Ahead of the tournament, ESPN named her to their top 25 player ranking. After winning all three of their group stage matches, the team finished at the top of their group and advanced to the knockout stage. During the Round of 16, the Dutch team faced 2011 champions, Japan, who had knocked them out of the 2015 World Cup. This time, the Netherlands won 2–1 and advanced to the quarterifinals. Of the match, The Guardian called Van de Donk "Holland's best player tonight." The Dutch team faced Italy in the quarterfinal and won 2–1 advancing to the semifinal for the first time in team history. Van de Donk played every minute of the semi-final against Sweden until the team scored a goal in the ninth minute of extra time and won the match 1–0, advancing to the final for the first time. The Netherlands faced 2015 champions the United States and lost 2–0. She also played in the Final. Following the loss, she noted: "The growth [of women’s football in the Netherlands] is ridiculous. If I look at women’s football and the hype, it’s amazing. I think that’s what I’m most proud of, that we got so much respect from the Netherlands."

On 8 October 2019, Van de Donk scored a goal in her 100th international appearance, a 2–0 win against Russia.

Personal life
Van de Donk has previously been in a relationship with former Arsenal teammate Beth Mead. She is currently in a relationship with Australian footballer and Olympique Lyonnais teammate Ellie Carpenter.

Career statistics
Scores and results list the Netherlands' goal tally first, score column indicates score after each van de Donk goal.

* Note: Match not considered as an official friendly.

Honours

VVV-Venlo
 KNVB Women's Cup: runner-up 2012

PSV/FC Eindhoven
 KNVB Women's Cup: runner-up 2014

Arsenal
 FA Women's Cup: 2015–16
 FA WSL Cup: 2017–18
 FA WSL: 2018–19

Olympique Lyonnais
 Division 1 Féminine: 2021–22
 UEFA Women's Champions League: 2021–22

Netherlands
UEFA European Women's Championship: 2017
 FIFA Women's World Cup: runner-up 2019
Algarve Cup: 2018
 Tournoi de France: runner-up 2020

See also
 List of women's footballers with 100 or more international caps 
 List of FA WSL hat-tricks
 List of foreign FA Women's Super League players
 List of foreign Damallsvenskan players
 List of LGBT sportspeople
 List of UEFA Women's Championship goalscorers

References

Further reading
 Grainey, Timothy (2012), Beyond Bend It Like Beckham: The Global Phenomenon of Women's Soccer, University of Nebraska Press, 
 Postma, Annemarie (2017), De Oranje leeuwinnen: het Nederlands vrouweneftal, Ambo/Anthos B.V., 
 Raphael, Amy and Gary Lineker (2019), A Game of Two-Halves: Famous Football Fans Meet Their Heroes, Atlantic Books, 
 Vissers, Willem (2019), Meisjesdromen: van EK-debuut tot WK-finale in tien jaar, Overamstel Uitgevers,

External links

Netherlands profile at onsoranje.nl 
Arsenal profile

1991 births
Living people
People from Valkenswaard
Dutch women's footballers
Netherlands women's international footballers
Eredivisie (women) players
Damallsvenskan players
BK Häcken FF players
Expatriate women's footballers in France
2015 FIFA Women's World Cup players
Expatriate women's footballers in Sweden
Dutch expatriate sportspeople in Sweden
Women's association football midfielders
Arsenal W.F.C. players
Expatriate women's footballers in England
Dutch expatriate sportspeople in England
Division 1 Féminine players
PSV (women) players
Willem II (women) players
VVV-Venlo (women) players
UEFA Women's Championship-winning players
Knights of the Order of Orange-Nassau
2019 FIFA Women's World Cup players
FIFA Century Club
Dutch expatriate women's footballers
Dutch LGBT sportspeople
LGBT association football players
Footballers at the 2020 Summer Olympics
Olympic footballers of the Netherlands
21st-century Dutch LGBT people
UEFA Women's Euro 2022 players
Footballers from North Brabant
Dutch expatriate sportspeople in France
UEFA Women's Euro 2017 players
21st-century Dutch women
Association footballers' wives and girlfriends